Daviesia chapmanii is a species of flowering plant in the family Fabaceae and is endemic to the south-west of Western Australia. It is a dense, compact, rounded shrub with sharply-ridged branches, densely crowded, sharply-pointed phyllodes, and pale yellow flowers with deep pink markings.

Description

Taxonomy and naming
Daviesia chapmanii was first formally described in 1995 by Michael Crisp in Australian Systematic Botany from specimens collected near the Hill River bridge on the Brand Highway in 1979. The specific epithet (chapmanii) honours the plant collector, Charles Chapman (1904–1988).

Distribution and habitat
This species of pea grows in kwongan, mostly restricted to the area between Badgingarra, Eneabba and Carnamah in the Avon Wheatbelt and Geraldton Sandplains biogeographic regions of south-western Western Australia.

Conservation status
Daviesia chapmanii is listed as "not threatened" by the Department of Biodiversity, Conservation and Attractions.

References

chapmanii
Eudicots of Western Australia
Plants described in 1995
Taxa named by Michael Crisp